George Harrison Ivey (29 October 1923 – November 1979) was an English professional footballer who played as a winger in the Football League for York City and in non-League football for Horden Colliery Welfare, West Stanley, South Shields and Easington Colliery Welfare.

References

1923 births
People from Stanley, County Durham
Footballers from County Durham
1979 deaths
English footballers
Association football forwards
Darlington Town F.C. players
West Stanley F.C. players
York City F.C. players
South Shields F.C. (1936) players
Easington Colliery A.F.C. players
English Football League players